Badr Siwane (born 1 January 1994) is a Moroccan triathlete.

He was the men's winner at the 2017 and 2018 African Triathlon Championships.

He represented Morocco at the 2019 African Games held in Rabat, Morocco and he won the men's triathlon event.

References

External links 
 

1994 births
Living people
Moroccan male triathletes
African Games gold medalists for Morocco
African Games medalists in triathlon
Competitors at the 2019 African Games
21st-century Moroccan people